The Shrine Auditorium is a landmark large-event venue in Los Angeles, California. It is also the headquarters of the Al Malaikah Temple, a division of the Shriners. It was designated a Los Angeles Historic-Cultural Monument (No. 139) in 1975, and was added to the National Register of Historic Places in 1987.

History
Opened in 1926, the current Shrine Auditorium replaced an earlier 1906 Al Malaikah Temple which had been destroyed by a fire on January 11, 1920. The fire gutted the structure in just 30 minutes, and nearly killed six firefighters in the process.

In the late 1960s, the Shrine was referred to as "The Pinnacle" by the audiences of rock concerts.

In 2002, the auditorium underwent a $15 million renovation that upgraded the stage with state-of-the-art lighting and rigging systems, and included new roofing and air conditioning for both the Auditorium and Expo Center, modernized concession stands, additional restrooms, repainting of the Expo Center, and a new performance plaza and parking garage. The entire complex follows a Moroccan architectural motif.

Building
The new auditorium was designed in the Moorish Revival style by San Francisco-based theater architect G. Albert Lansburgh, with local architects John C. Austin and A. M. Edelman associated. When built, the auditorium could hold 1,200 people on stage and seat an audience of 6,442. An engineer who consulted on the project said that the steel truss supporting the balcony was the largest ever constructed.

The Auditorium features two boxes above the orchestra level holding 40 people each and seven loges on the balcony holding between 36 and 47 seats each (total capacity of the loges: 274). Of the remaining seats, 2,964 are on the orchestra level and 2,982 on the balcony level.

Adjacent to the Auditorium is the Shrine Exposition Hall. This is a multi-purpose event facility. It features  of exhibit and meeting space—34,000 in the main level and 20,000 in an open mezzanine. The Exposition Hall has a capacity of 5,000 patrons. Trade shows, banquets, conventions and electronic music festivals, among other events, have been held there.

Notable events

The Shrine Auditorium has hosted a number of events, mainly for entertainment:

See also
List of convention centers in the United States
List of Los Angeles Historic-Cultural Monuments in South Los Angeles
List of Registered Historic Places in Los Angeles
Bridges Auditorium
Dorothy Chandler Pavilion

References

External links

Shrine LA! Shrine Auditorium and Expo Hall Official Site

Image of Stevie Wonder and Patti LaBelle performing at the Shrine Auditorium, 1978. Los Angeles TimesPhotographic Archive (Collection 1429). UCLA Library Special Collections, Charles E. Young Research Library, University of California, Los Angeles.

Concert halls in California
Convention centers in California
Basketball venues in Los Angeles
Theatres in Los Angeles
Los Angeles Historic-Cultural Monuments
Masonic buildings in California
Masonic buildings completed in 1925
Event venues established in 1925
Theatres on the National Register of Historic Places in Los Angeles
Shriners
University Park, Los Angeles
USC Trojans basketball venues
Moorish Revival architecture in California
Event venues on the National Register of Historic Places in California
Grammy Award venues